Kwai Chung Hospital is a psychiatric hospital in Kwai Chung, Hong Kong, located near Princess Margaret Hospital. Officially opened on 15 October 1981, the hospital currently provides 920 psychiatric beds, serving the population of Kwai Chung, Tsing Yi, Tsuen Wan, Tung Chung, North Lantau and part of Kowloon.

Apart from in-patient psychiatric services for adult psychiatric patients, it also develops psychiatric specialty services which include Child and Adolescent Psychiatric Services, Psychogeriatric Services, Community Psychiatry, Consultation Liaison Services, Substance Abuse Assessment Unit and Psychiatric Unit for Learning Disabilities.

The hospital also provides out-patient department and day hospital services for psychiatric patients at West Kowloon Psychiatric Centre and East Kowloon Psychiatric Centre.

The hospital is reachable by Lai King Hill Road.

History
Kwai Chung Hospital began its operations in November 1980 and was officially opened on 15 October 1981 by the Hong Kong Governor, Murray MacLehose.

References

External links

Hospital buildings completed in 1981
Psychiatric hospitals in Hong Kong
Kwai Chung
Lai King
Hospitals established in 1981